Fabiana Cantilo (born March 3, 1959 in Buenos Aires) is an Argentine singer-songwriter. She has sold more than 6 million records in her career.

Biography 
She was born in Buenos Aires, on March 3, 1959, daughter of Silvina Luro Pueyrredón and Gabriel Cantilo. Her first steps in music were at the age of 8 when she was already studying guitar. Her first great performance was at a school event at the Bayard Institute, where she interpreted "Balada para un loco" in front of Astor Piazzolla and Amelita Baltar, who were in the audience.

Discography

Los Twist 
 La Dicha en Movimiento (1983)

Soloist 
 Detectives (1985)
 Fabiana Cantilo y los Perros Calientes (1988)
 Algo Mejor (1991)
 Mi enfermedad 
 Golpes al Vacío (1993)
 Sol en Cinco (1995)
 De Qué Se Ríen?  (1998)
 Información Celeste (2002)
 Inconsciente Colectivo (2005)
 Hija del Rigor  (2007)
 En la Vereda del Sol (2009)
 Ahora (2011)
 Superamor (2015)

Compilations 
Lo Mejor (1997)
Libre Acceso: Ya No Creo en tu Amor (1997)
Lo Mejor de Fabiana Cantilo (1999)

References

External links
 Official site
 Rock.com.ar Fabiana Cantilo biography
 Itematika.com Discs
 Musica.com songs

1959 births
Living people
Argentine women singer-songwriters
Argentine singer-songwriters
Singers from Buenos Aires
Women in Latin music